Florence Agnes Henderson (February 14, 1934 – November 24, 2016) was an American actress. With a career spanning six decades, she is best known for her starring role as Carol Brady on the ABC sitcom The Brady Bunch. Henderson also appeared in film, as well as on stage, and hosted several long-running cooking and variety shows over the years. She appeared as a guest on many scripted and unscripted (talk and reality show) television programs and as a panelist on numerous game shows. She was a contestant on Dancing with the Stars in 2010.

Henderson hosted her own talk show, The Florence Henderson Show, and cooking show, Who's Cooking with Florence Henderson, on Retirement Living TV  during the years leading up to her death at age 82 on Thanksgiving 2016 from heart failure.

Early life
Henderson, the youngest of 10 children, was born on February 14, 1934, in Dale, Indiana, a small town in the southwestern part of the state. She was a daughter of Elizabeth (née Elder), a homemaker, and Joseph Henderson, a tobacco sharecropper. During the Great Depression, she was taught to sing at the age of two by her mother, who had a repertoire of 50 songs. By the time she was eight, her family called her "Florency", and by age 12, she was singing at local grocery stores.

Henderson graduated from St. Francis Academy in Owensboro, Kentucky, in 1951 and shortly thereafter went to New York City, enrolling in the American Academy of Dramatic Arts. She was an Alumna Initiate of the Alpha Chi chapter of Delta Zeta sorority.

Career
Henderson started her career on the stage performing in musicals, such as the touring production of Oklahoma! and South Pacific at Lincoln Center.She debuted on Broadway in the musical Wish You Were Here in 1952, and later starred on Broadway in the long-running 1954 musical, Fanny (888 performances) in which she originated the title role. Henderson appeared with Gordon MacRae in the Oklahoma! segment of the 90-minute television special General Foods 25th Anniversary Show: A Salute to Rodgers and Hammerstein (1954). She later appeared in "The Abbe and the Nymph", an episode of the 1950s TV series I Spy (not to be confused with the 1960s series of the same name). She also portrayed Meg March in a CBS-TV musical adaptation of Little Women, which aired October 16, 1958.

Henderson appeared in two episodes of The United States Steel Hour. She portrayed Mary Jane in an episodic adaptation of Adventures of Huckleberry Finn, which aired on November 20, 1957. She also appeared in "A Family Alliance", an episodic adaptation of a short story from A Harvest of Stories (1956) by Dorothy Canfield Fisher, which aired on June 4, 1958.

Henderson, along with Bill Hayes, appeared in the Oldsmobile commercials from 1958 through 1961 on The Patti Page Show for which Oldsmobile was the sponsor. In 1959, she sang "Don't Let a Be-Back Get Away", in Good News About Olds, an industrial musical for Oldsmobile. Bill Hayes and she also gave a musical performance on the January 13, 1960, broadcast of Tonight Starring Jack Paar. Henderson also appeared on Broadway in The Girl Who Came to Supper (1963).

In 1962, she won the Sarah Siddons Award for her work in Chicago theatre, and the same year became the first woman to guest host The Tonight Show in the period after Jack Paar left as the show's host, and before Johnny Carson began his 30 years as the show's longest serving host in October 1962. She also joined the ranks of what was then called The Today Girl on NBC's long-running morning show, doing weather and light news, a position also once held by Barbara Walters.

She gave later musical performances on Paar's subsequent talk show in 1963, including the January 25 and February 22 broadcasts. She performed in the May 19, 1963, broadcast of The Voice of Firestone, alongside baritone Mario Sereni. She also released her albums under RCA Victor as part of her music career.

Her most widely recognized role was as Carol Brady in The Brady Bunch which aired on ABC from 1969 until 1974. Henderson's best friend, Shirley Jones, had turned down the role, but the following year, she accepted the similar role of a mother with five children, named Shirley Partridge, in The Partridge Family, which aired from 1970 to 1974.

Primarily owing to her role on The Brady Bunch, Henderson was ranked by TV Land and Entertainment Weekly as number 54 on their list of the 100 Greatest TV Icons.

An avid game-show fan, Henderson was a frequent panelist on the original version of Hollywood Squares and made occasional appearances on The $25,000 Pyramid.  Her other game show appearances include Password, the original Match Game, What's My Line (as a panelist and a mystery guest), To Tell The Truth, I've Got A Secret, Snap Judgment, Personality, The Magnificent Marble Machine, and Who Wants to Be a Millionaire?.  She also appeared alongside her Brady Bunch co-star Robert Reed on the John Davidson-hosted version of Hollywood Squares and teamed with Reed, Maureen McCormick, Christopher Knight and Susan Olsen on one of the original Family Feud's All-Star weeks, where they finished in second place.

Henderson was the spokeswoman for Wesson cooking oil from 1974 to 1996. During that time, she hosted a cooking show on TNN, Country Kitchen, and did ads for Prange's, a Wisconsin department store chain. Henderson co-hosted the short-lived NBC morning talk show Later Today (1999–2000), with Jodi Applegate and Asha Blake.

In the 2000s, she was the spokeswoman for Polident. In 2003, Henderson seemed to poke fun at her wholesome image by appearing in a Pepsi Twist television commercial with Ozzy Osbourne.

Henderson also appeared with her TV children, as she did with Christopher Knight on the reality television series My Fair Brady. She was also in the sixth season of VH1's The Surreal Life.

Beginning in the mid-1990s, Henderson would perform the song "God Bless America" at the Indianapolis 500, accompanied by the Purdue All-American Marching Band, at the request of the Hulman-George family, the owners of the Indianapolis Motor Speedway and friends of Henderson's.

She appeared in the "Weird Al" Yankovic video for "Amish Paradise". In 2002, she made a memorable guest appearance on improvisational comedy show Whose Line Is It Anyway?, participating in on-screen kisses with Ryan Stiles and Colin Mochrie.

From 2007 to 2009, Henderson co-hosted the daily talk show Living Live with former Designing Women star Meshach Taylor on Retirement Living TV. The show was reworked to focus on her and was renamed The Florence Henderson Show. The show was nominated for an Emmy award in 2010. In May 2010, Henderson did a series of promotional radio ads for Fox. On the July 12, 2010, edition of WWE Raw, Henderson appeared as the night's guest host.

Henderson was one of 12 celebrities competing on the 11th season of Dancing with the Stars, which premiered on September 20, 2010. Her professional partner was Corky Ballas, father of two-time champion Mark Ballas. On October 19, 2010, she was the fifth contestant eliminated.

Henderson voiced Barbara, Cleveland Brown's childhood nanny, in the episode "The Men In Me" of The Cleveland Show, which originally aired on March 25, 2012. The episode features a depressed and confused Cleveland singing a parody version of his show's theme before Barbara interjects and gets Cleveland to realize it does not matter who he is or who others perceive him to be as long as he accepts himself for who and what he is. At the end of the episode, Cleveland says, "Florence Henderson, everyone!"

Henderson made a special appearance on May 11, 2012, in a special Mother's Day episode on The Price Is Right with Drew Carey, displaying prizes, as well as one of the showcases.

In February 2013, she began hosting a cooking show, Who's Cooking with Florence Henderson, on Retirement Living TV. Henderson hosted several times the beauty pageants Mrs. America and Mrs. World.

Charity appearances
In the 2000s, Henderson became a public benefactor to the Sisters of St. Benedict in Ferdinand, Indiana. Some of the nuns there had been early educators of Henderson. She appeared in a number of their promotional videos and helped in fundraising efforts. She won money for the sisters on the game show Weakest Link and on a classic television-themed episode of Who Wants to Be a Millionaire in 2001, winning $32,000 in their name. When Henderson appeared on The Surreal Life, she refused to wear a nun's habit in a comedy skit.

Personal life
Henderson married her first husband, Ira Bernstein, in 1956. They had four children together before divorcing in 1985. In 1987, she married her second husband, hypnotherapist Dr. John George Kappas, whom she had met when he treated her for depression and stage fright in the early 1980s. They remained married until his death in 2002. Henderson had five grandchildren.

Death
Henderson died on November 24, 2016, at Cedars-Sinai Medical Center in Los Angeles, California, at the age of 82. She had been hospitalized the previous day. According to her manager, Kayla Pressman, Henderson died of heart failure. Three days before her death, Henderson had attended the recording of Dancing with the Stars to support her friend and former on-screen daughter Maureen McCormick, who was a contestant. Pressman stated that Henderson was not ill prior to her sudden hospitalization and that her death was a "shock". She was cremated, and her ashes interred at Westwood Village Memorial Park Cemetery in Los Angeles.

Awards
At the 33rd Annual Gracie Awards Gala (2008), Henderson won an Individual Achievement Award and an Outstanding Host (Information or Entertainment) for The Florence Henderson Show.

She won another Outstanding Host (Information or Entertainment) at the 37th Annual Gracie Awards Gala (2012) for co-hosting Good Food, Good Deeds.

A  turf horse race for 3-year old and older fillies and mares born and bred in Indiana held at Indiana Grand Racing & Casino since 2004 is named in her honor, the Florence Henderson Stakes, on the Tuesday after Labor Day in September.

Selected filmography

Film

Television

Stage

Book

References

External links

 
 
 
 
 
 
 Image of Ricardo Montalbán and Florence Henderson in a theater production of "The King and I" in Los Angeles, California, 1965. Los Angeles Times Photographic Archive (Collection 1429). UCLA Library Special Collections, Charles E. Young Research Library, University of California, Los Angeles.

1934 births
2016 deaths
20th-century American actresses
21st-century American actresses
Actresses from Indiana
American Academy of Dramatic Arts alumni
American women singers
American film actresses
American musical theatre actresses
American stage actresses
American television actresses
American voice actresses
Beauty pageant hosts
Burials at Westwood Village Memorial Park Cemetery
Participants in American reality television series
People from Spencer County, Indiana